Dragon Seed may refer to:

 Dragon Seed (novel), written by Pearl S. Buck
 Dragon Seed (film), its adaptation
 Dragonseeds, a 1998 video game for the PlayStation